The gargoyle is a fantasy and horror monster inspired by the gargoyle architectural element. While they were believed in mythology to frighten away evil spirits, the idea of such statues physically coming to life is a more recent notion. Like golems, they are usually made of magically animated or transformed stone, but have animal or chimera traits and are often guardians of a place such as a cathedral or castle. They can also be depicted as vessels for demonic possession or as a living species resembling statues.

Description

As evil constructs
The notion of gargoyles as supernatural constructs brought to life by evil was introduced in Maker of Gargoyles (1932), a short pulp fiction story by Clark Ashton Smith where Reynard, a medieval stonemason, unconsciously infuses his hate and lust into two gargoyles that attack the town of Vyones and later kill him when he attempts to destroy them.

In the novelette Conjure Wife (1943) by Fritz Lieber, a dragon sculpture is animated by a witch and sent to kill an archaeology professor.

Such gargoyles also entered science fiction, such as in the Doctor Who episode The Daemons (1971).

As demonic vessels
The notion of gargoyles as demonic vessels was introduced in The Horn of Vapula (Lewis Spence, 1932), in which a demon familiar is bound into a horned and goatlike gargoyle.

Gargoyles appear as horned canine statues in the movie Ghostbusters (1984), where they are possessed by the demonic spirits of Zuul and Vinz Klortho.

Gargoyles may also appear as vessels for formerly human souls, such as the Marvel Comics hero Gargoyle, who later is able to transform back into a human.

As a race of beings resembling statues
The 1908 children's book Dorothy and the Wizard in Oz featured a Land of the Gargoyles, wooden creatures with hinged wings.

The film Gargoyles (1972)  depicted a fictional race created by Satan to harry mankind.

A species of gargoyles also exists in Dungeons & Dragons.

Movies featuring races of gargoyle-like creatures include Gargoyle (2004) and Rise of the Gargoyles (2009), in which the creatures can lay eggs and turn into statues to blend in.

Friendly gargoyles 
The notion of a friendly gargoyle was used by the Disney show Gargoyles (1994–1997) in which gargoyles battle monsters to protect humanity. It originates from the folk belief of gargoyles as protectors. Friendly gargoyles also appear in the Discworld universe, such as Constable Downspout in Feet of Clay (1996), and in Disney's The Hunchback of Notre Dame (1996), as Hugo, Victor and Laverne uk, who embody Quasimodo's subconscious.

In popular culture
Gargoyles have occupied a prominent place in film, television, and gaming due to their distinctive characteristics.

Film and television
Gargoyles is an American animated television series produced by Walt Disney Television and distributed by Buena Vista Television, and originally aired from October 24, 1994, to February 15, 1997. The series features a species of nocturnal creatures known as gargoyles that turn to stone during the day. After spending a thousand years  an enchanted petrified state, the gargoyles (who have been transported from medieval Scotland) are reawakened in modern-day New York City, and take on roles as the city's secret night-time protectors. Gargoyles was noted for its relatively dark tone, complex story arcs, and melodrama; character arcs were heavily employed throughout the series, as were Shakespearean themes. The series also received favorable comparisons to Batman: The Animated Series. A video game adaptation and a spin-off comic series were released in 1995. The show's storyline continued from 2006 to 2009 in a comic book series of the same title, produced by Slave Labor Graphics. IGN ranked Gargoyles 45th place on its 2009 list of top 100 animated series, stating: "A decent success at the time, Gargoyles has maintained a strong cult following since it ended more than a decade ago". Hollywood.com featured it on their 2010 list of six cartoons that should be movies. UGO.com included it on their 2011 top list of legendary medieval and fantasy TV shows.

The first season of the TV series Huntik: Secrets & Seekers features a titan known as "Gar-Ghoul" who appearance and backstory draw on the lore of gargoyles.

The third season of the TV series Riverdale features a monstrous antagonist known as the "Gargoyle King."

Comics
Gargoyle is a name shared by two fictional characters appearing in American comic books published by Marvel Comics. The first Gargoyle, Yuri Topolov, appears in The Incredible Hulk #1 (May 1962), and was created by Stan Lee and Jack Kirby. The first Gargoyle received an entry in the Official Handbook of the Marvel Universe Deluxe Edition #17, where his real name was revealed. The second Gargoyle, Isaac Christians, is a human/demon composite and a member of the Defenders. He was created by writer J. M. DeMatteis and artist Don Perlin. Perlin's design was inspired by a sequence in Prince Valiant in which the titular hero disguises himself as a gargoyle. During his long run on The Defenders, Gargoyle also was the co-star of Marvel Team-Up #119, written by his co-creator DeMatteis, who later described the issue as "one of my favorite favorite stories". In 1985 Marvel published a four-issue Gargoyle limited series, written by DeMatteis and drawn by Mark Badger. DeMatteis said of the series, "It was a psychological fantasy. You take the interior life and make it concrete... give it substance... and play with it."

Gaming

D & D 
In the Dungeons & Dragons fantasy role-playing game, a gargoyle is a grotesque winged monstrous humanoid creature, with a horned head and a stony hide. The gargoyle was one of the first monsters introduced in the earliest edition of the game, in the Dungeons & Dragons "white box" set (1974), where they were described as a reptilian bipedal beast, Chaotic in alignment. The kopoacinth, an aquatic version of the gargoyle, first appeared in the 1975 Dungeons & Dragons supplement, Blackmoor by Dave Arneson. The gargoyle appears in the first edition Monster Manual (1977), where it is described as a ferocious predator of a magical nature, found among ruins; it attacks anything it can detect. The marlgoyle, a more horrid form of gargoyle, first appears in the module Lost Caverns of Tsojcanth (1982), and later appears in Monster Manual II (1983) as the margoyle.

This edition of the D&D game included its own version of the gargoyle, in the Dungeons & Dragons Basic Set (1977, 1981, 1983). The gargoyle was also later featured in the Dungeons & Dragons Game set (1991), the Dungeons & Dragons Rules Cyclopedia (1991), and the Classic Dungeons & Dragons Game set (1994). The gargoyle and margoyle also appear first in the Monstrous Compendium Volume Two (1989), and are reprinted in the Monstrous Manual (1993), along with the kapoacinth.

The Greyhawk campaign setting module Gargoyle (1989) featured the gargoyle (of the Tors).  In Gargoyle, set in the City of Greyhawk, the player characters are hired by a pair of gargoyles to find their stolen wings. The grist (true gargoyle) appeared in Vale of the Mage (1990). The guardgoyle for the Forgotten Realms setting appeared in the Ruins of Zhentil Keep boxed set (1995). Four variant gargoyles appeared in the "Dragon's Bestiary" column of Dragon #223 (November 1995), including the archer, the grandfather plaque, the spouter, and the stone lion. These creatures were reprinted in Monstrous Compendium Annual Three (1996).

The gargoyle and kapoacinth appear in the Monster Manual for the 3.0 edition (2000–2002), and in the revised Monster Manual for 3.5 edition (2003–2007). The guardgoyle returned in City of Splendors: Waterdeep (2005). The gargoyle appears in the Monster Manual for the 4th edition (2008–2014), including the nabassu gargoyle.

Ordinarily, gargoyles are stone statues carved into a demonic shape and imbued with life by magical means, akin to a golem. However, their descriptions in the official source materials are sometimes unprecise and even conflicting; in the 2nd edition Monstrous Compendium, for instance, their stats summary lists their diet as carnivorous, while the description of their ecology explains that a gargoyle requires neither food or water to survive. In some D&D-related works, gargoyles and their kin (see Variants, below) are even erroneously depicted as biological creatures capable of natural reproduction. A gargoyle is usually chaotic evil. Gargoyles are sentient, cunning, and malevolent to the extreme. Their favorite sport is to capture intelligent beings and slowly torture them to death. Due to its stone body, a gargoyle has the ability to hold itself so still that it appears to be a statue. Standard gargoyles possess wings which give them flight capability.

The gargoyle is fully detailed in Paizo Publishing's book Classic Horrors Revisited (2009), on pages 16–21.\

Video games
Gargoyle's Quest: Ghosts 'n Goblins is an action-adventure game for the original Game Boy. Developed by Capcom, it was released on May 2, 1990, in Japan, then North America in July, and lastly Europe in 1991. The playable character Red Arremer (Firebrand in the U.S.) made his debut in the video game series Ghosts 'n Goblins as an antagonist character, of which this is a spin-off. Gargoyle's Quest was followed by the NES prequel Gargoyle's Quest II in 1992 and the Super Nintendo Entertainment System sequel Demon's Crest in 1994. According to the fictional game lore, Firebrand is a gargoyle predestined to carry on the namesake and identity of the Red Blaze – the powerful force that fought back the Destroyers long before this game takes place. As his destiny foretold, Firebrand saves the Ghoul Realm from brutal conquest by traversing the Ghoul Realm, building his powers, and preparing to fight against the Destroyers' king, Breager, so as to ensure the protection of the Ghoul Realm once more. Gargoyle's Quest was warmly received by contemporary and later critics alike, and sold well enough to warrant a prequel on the NES only two years later. Gargoyles also appear in the 1997 first-person shooter Blood by Monolith Productions and take two forms, one of flesh and one of stone

The Yuri Topolov version of Gargoyle appears in the Lego Marvel's Avengers video game.

A video game adaptation of the Disney TV series, Gargoyles, was released in 1995.

The popular MMORPG “RuneScape” features  gargoyles as a slayer creature.

The Elder Scrolls V: Skyrim – Dawnguard features gargoyles as monsters, summonable by the player character, or encountered in certain dungeons.

Others
Animatronic gargoyle statues are a popular Halloween or haunted attraction commodity.

In Monster High, Rochelle Goyle is the daughter of the gargoyles.

The H.I.M. music video Kiss of Dawn features many Gargoyles and Grotesques.

References 

Fictional monsters
Fictional species and races
 
Grotesques